South West Acute Hospital is a local teaching hospital located in Enniskillen, County Fermanagh, Northern Ireland. It is managed by Western Health and Social Care Trust.

History
The hospital was built to replace the Erne Hospital, and was opened by the Queen and the Duke of Edinburgh on 21 June 2012. It was the first new hospital to be built in Northern Ireland for more than a decade, and was the first hospital in Northern Ireland with single ensuite rooms for every patient.

Facilities 
The hospital has up to 210 inpatient and 22 day-case beds.

Services 
The hospital has been designated as one of the nine acute hospitals in the acute hospital network of Northern Ireland on which healthcare would be focused under the government health policy 'Developing Better Services'.

Teaching 
The hospital is a university teaching hospital for both Queen's University Belfast and the Royal College of Surgeons in Ireland.

References

External links 

 
 Inspection reports from the Regulation and Quality Improvement Authority

Western Health and Social Care Trust
Health and Social Care (Northern Ireland) hospitals
Teaching hospitals in Northern Ireland
Hospital buildings completed in 2012
Hospitals established in 2012
2012 establishments in Northern Ireland
Hospitals in County Fermanagh
21st-century architecture in Northern Ireland